Color on Me (stylized color on me) is the debut extended play (EP) by South Korean singer and songwriter Kang Daniel. It was released on July 25, 2019 by Konnect Entertainment and distributed by Sony Music Korea. Color on Me contains five tracks with "What Are You Up To"  serving as its lead single.

Background
On July 11 at midnight KST, Konnect Entertainment launched a new website with a 24-hour countdown, and on July 12 at midnight KST, the first teaser for Kang Daniel's solo debut which included the date July 25, 2019 was revealed. On the same day, it was revealed that Kei Lim, CEO of Devine-Channel, was the main producer of the EP. In the following days, four more teaser images were released on Konnect's official website and the pre-order for only one version of the EP started on July 16. On July 18, the tracklist was revealed showing a total of five songs with audio previews for each released the following day.

Lim revealed that the album was completed in such a short time due to Kang focusing solely on producing the album. While Lim assisted with the album's technical side, Kang mostly controlled its direction and message. At the debut showcase, Kang stated the album's title was inspired from the second track "Color" since he wanted to show his diverse sides. He participated in writing four songs and received a lot of inspiration from films and fans' messages.

Packaging
Korean graphic designer Jiyoon Lee of Studio XXX was responsible for the album design of Color on Me. In an interview with Bandwagon Asia explaining her creative process, she revealed that both her and Konnect Entertainment were in agreement to emphasize Kang's presence as a solo artist and "wanted the album to look like a special edition from a fashion magazine".

Promotion
Kang Daniel held two debut showcases on July 25 at YES24 Live Hall, 4PM KST for the press and 8PM KST for his fans. He held six domestic fan-signs between July 31 and August 3 in Gwangju, Daejeon, Busan, Daegu, Yeouido, and Sangam. Following that, Kang kicked off the international leg of his fan meeting tour with stops in Singapore, Bangkok, Taipei, Kuala Lumpur, and Manila. He ended the tour in Ilsan with a two-day fan meeting on November 23–24 and a three-day exhibition ending on the 24th at KINTEX. In between touring, Kang organized "What Are You Up To" and "I Hope" mu:fully performance video uploads in early September. His first general public event performance occurred on October 25 at Busan One Asia Festival.

Commercial performance
On July 22, it was reported that stock pre-orders for Color on Me exceeded 450,000 copies over the first seven days of the pre-order period.

Upon its release in South Korea, Color on Me sold 342,218 copies on its first-day, making it the highest first-day sales for a soloist in the history of Hanteo Chart. As of July 31, the third day since the EP's physical release, Color on Me sold over 400,000 copies, also breaking the record for the highest first-week sales for a soloist in the history of Hanteo Chart. It topped South Korea's Gaon Album Chart and entered Japan's Oricon Albums Chart at number 23.

Despite not appearing on any music shows, Kang took home his first-ever solo music show win on KBS2's Music Bank with "What Are You Up To" placing first on August 9, 2019. Later that year, Sony Music Entertainment announced its biggest global sellers for its second fiscal quarter of 2019 with Kang's Color on Me placing fifth.

Track listing

Charts

Weekly charts

Monthly charts

Year-end charts

Certifications and sales

Release history

See also
List of certified albums in South Korea
List of Gaon Album Chart number ones of 2019

References

Kang Daniel albums
2019 debut EPs
Korean-language EPs
Sony Music EPs
Konnect Entertainment EPs